The 2017–18 ABA League First Division was the 17th season of the ABA League with 12 teams from Serbia, Croatia, Slovenia, Montenegro, Bosnia and Herzegovina and the Republic of Macedonia participating in it. It was the inaugural season as the first tier as a part of two level competition.

Format changes
On May 23, 2017, ABA League Assembly has decided that there will be 12 clubs competing in the league in the 2017–18 season. Having analysed the current situation in European and the regional basketball, as well as the fact that the ABA League is still not officially recognized by the national basketball federations, and with a goal to protect the interests of the ABA League founding clubs, the clubs that have competed in the 2016–17 season will have a right to participate in the forthcoming season as well and the priority of participation will be given to the founders of the ABA League (from the 2015–16 season). The formula to determine the participants which will be respected is the following:

  – three clubs
  – three clubs
  – one club
  – one club
  – one club
  – one club

Two additional spots will be allocated to the clubs from countries, whose clubs have achieved the best coefficients in the country rankings during the 2016–17 season. Those two countries are Serbia and Montenegro. The places from Serbia will be filled in accordance with the final standings of the Basketball League of Serbia, in accordance with the recognition and cooperation with the ABA League.

In accordance with the previously mentioned decisions, the participating clubs of the ABA League for the 2017–18 season are: Cedevita, Zadar, Cibona, Union Olimpija, Igokea, Budućnost VOLI, MZT Skopje Aerodrom and Mornar, while the remaining four places (from Serbia), were determined in accordance with the standings in the Basketball League of Serbia.

Teams

National standings
The numbers of teams by country is determined by a coefficient that is the sum of all victories clubs from a certain country achieve in a regular season divided by the number of clubs from that country. By using this coefficient majority of places for current season are allocated, while the remaining places are given via wild cards from league board.

Team allocation 

League positions of the previous domestic league season after playoffs shown in parentheses.

Venues and locations

Personnel and sponsorship

Coaching changes

Regular season

League table

Positions by round

Results

Playoffs

The semi-finals was played in a best-of-three format, while the Finals were played in a best-of-five format. Playoffs started on 17 March 2018, while the Finals ended on 14 April 2018.

Semifinals

Finals

Final standings

Statistical leaders
 , after the end of the Regular Season.

| width=50% valign=top |

Points

 

|}

|}

| width=50% valign=top |

Assists

|}

|}Source: ABA League

Awards

MVP List

MVP of the Round

MVP of the Month

Attendances
Attendances include playoff games:

ABA League clubs in European competitions

See also 
 2017–18 ABA League Second Division
 2017 ABA League Supercup
 2017–18 Junior ABA League
 2017–18 WABA League
2017–18 domestic competitions
  2017–18 Basketball League of Serbia
  2017–18 A-1 League
  2017–18 Slovenian Basketball League
  2017–18 Prva A liga
  2017–18 Basketball Championship of Bosnia and Herzegovina
  2017–18 Macedonian First League
Teams 
 2017–18 KK Crvena zvezda season
 2017–18 KK Partizan season

References

External links 
 Official website
 ABA League at Eurobasket.com

 
2017-18

2017–18 in European basketball leagues
2017–18 in Serbian basketball
2017–18 in Slovenian basketball
2017–18 in Croatian basketball
2017–18 in Bosnia and Herzegovina basketball
2017–18 in Montenegrin basketball
2017–18 in Republic of Macedonia basketball